Events from the year 2013 in Ukraine.

Incumbents
President: Viktor Yanukovych
Prime Minister: Mykola Azarov

Events

February 13: At least five people were killed when a plane carrying football fans attempted an emergency landing and caught fire in the eastern city of Donetsk.
August 6: An ammonia leak at Horlivka chemical plant has killed five people and sickened more than 20.
November 24: More than 100,000 people protested in Kyiv against the decision of Viktor Yanukovych's government to suspend preparations for signing of the association agreement with the European Union under pressure from Russia.
November, December: Euromaidan.

Births

Deaths

References

 
2010s in Ukraine
Years of the 21st century in Ukraine
Ukraine
Ukraine